"Hang on St. Christopher" is a song by Tom Waits appearing on his 1987 album Franks Wild Years. It was released as a single in 1987 by Island Records.

Accolades 

(*) designates unordered lists.

Formats and track listing 
All songs written by Tom Waits.
US 12" single (0-96750)
 "Hang on St. Christopher" (Extended Remixed version) – 5:02
 "Hang on St. Christopher" (Instrumental version) – 2:50

Personnel
Adapted from the Hang on St. Christopher liner notes.

 Tom Waits – vocals, production
Musicians
 Michael Blair – drums
 Ralph Carney – tenor saxophone
 Mitchell Froom – keyboards
 Marc Ribot – guitar
 William Schimmel – Leslie bass pedals

Production and additional personnel
 Greg Cohen – musical arrangement
 Biff Dawes – recording, mixing
 Danny Leake – recording
 Howie Weinberg – mastering

Release history

Cover versions
 The song was covered by BulletBoys on their second album, 1991's Freakshow, and a video was made to promote the release. The song was also covered by Rod Stewart on his 1995 album A Spanner in the Works.

References

External links 
 

1987 songs
1987 singles
Tom Waits songs
BulletBoys songs
Songs written by Tom Waits
Island Records singles